Vista Center is an unincorporated community and census-designated place (CDP) located within Jackson Township in Ocean County, New Jersey, United States. As of the 2010 United States Census, the CDP's population was 3,689.

Geography
According to the United States Census Bureau, the CDP had a total area of 3.427 square miles (8.877 km2), including 3.388 square miles (8.775 km2) of land and 0.039 square miles (0.102 km2) of water (1.15%).

Demographics

Census 2010

Census 2000
As of the 2000 United States Census there were 541 people, 170 households, and 143 families living in the CDP. The population density was 60.5/km2 (156.7/mi2). There were 173 housing units at an average density of 19.4/km2 (50.1/mi2). The racial makeup of the CDP was 91.31% White, 4.44% African American, 0.18% Native American, 1.48% Asian, 0.55% from other races, and 2.03% from two or more races. Hispanic or Latino of any race were 6.28% of the population.

There were 170 households, out of which 45.3% had children under the age of 18 living with them, 72.9% were married couples living together, 7.1% had a female householder with no husband present, and 15.3% were non-families. 8.2% of all households were made up of individuals, and 3.5% had someone living alone who was 65 years of age or older. The average household size was 3.18 and the average family size was 3.42.

In the CDP the population was spread out, with 28.8% under the age of 18, 7.6% from 18 to 24, 36.4% from 25 to 44, 21.4% from 45 to 64, and 5.7% who were 65 years of age or older. The median age was 36 years. For every 100 females, there were 103.4 males. For every 100 females age 18 and over, there were 100.5 males.

The median income for a household in the CDP was $100,337, and the median income for a family was $101,125. Males had a median income of $50,156 versus $25,938 for females. The per capita income for the CDP was $29,620. None of the families and 1.1% of the population were living below the poverty line, including no under eighteens and none of those over 64.

References

Jackson Township, New Jersey
Census-designated places in Ocean County, New Jersey